The Historical Conquests of Josh Ritter is the fifth full-length album by American singer-songwriter Josh Ritter. It was released in the U.S. on August 21, 2007, in Ireland on September 7, 2007, through Independent Records, and released in the rest of Europe on October 1, 2007, by V2 Records. By July 26, 2007, the album had leaked onto peer-to-peer file-sharing websites.

The record was recorded in a Maine farmhouse dating to the 18th century. According to Ritter: "Lyrically, musically, and in terms of production, it's the most adventurous record I've made yet and I think when you hear it you're going to be surprised.  Seriously, repeatedly, and in a good way."

Thematic elements
The lyrics of the album's Dylanesque opening track, "To the Dogs or Whoever," contains a number of historical references, many of them to traditional American cultural and mythological figures:

Florence Nightingale
Calamity Jane
Joan of Arc
Casey Jones
Casey at the Bat
General George Armstrong Custer

The second verse of the song "Empty Hearts":

These lyrics reference the title of the first track on the album, which could be read as the friends' singing that first song or singing for a canine audience. The title of the first track on the CD is never mentioned in that song's lyrics, but Ritter self-referentially uses it in the lyrics of "Empty Hearts," suggesting that the songs on the CD may have an interrelated design.

Critical reception

In regards to The Historical Conquests of Josh Ritter, Paste Magazine described Ritter as the poster-boy of Americana music. As with previous albums, Ritter was compared to the great American songwriters like Bob Dylan and Bruce Springsteen.

Track listing
All songs written by Josh Ritter. The strings were written and arranged by Sam Kassirer, and the horns by Sam Kassirer and Zack Hickman.

 "To the Dogs or Whoever" – 3:02
 "Mind's Eye" – 2:53
 "Right Moves" – 3:44
 "The Temptation of Adam" – 4:12
 "Open Doors" – 2:35
 "Rumors" – 3:31
 "Edge of the World" – 1:41
 "Wait for Love" – 3:46
 "Real Long Distance" – 2:42
 "Next to the Last Romantic" – 2:49
 "Moons" – 0:51
 "Still Beating" – 3:49
 "Empty Hearts" – 4:40
 "Wait for Love (You Know You Will)" – 2:37

Credits

Personnel
 Josh Ritter — vocals and guitars
 Zack Hickman – double bass, electric bass, acoustic guitar and electric guitar, baritone guitar, trombone, lap steel guitar, background vocals
 Liam Hurley – drums, percussion
 Sam Kassirer — electric piano, piano, organs, guitar, vibraphone, percussion
 Matt Duglas —  Clarinet, Sax, Vocals

Production
 Mixed by Jacquire King
 Mastering by Jeff Lipton and Jessica Thompson

Bonus EP
Initial copies of the album included a limited-edition bonus EP CD containing "four little tracks – interesting 'bits and pieces' – from the recording sessions."

Track listing
 "Wildfires" – 4:48
 "Spot in my Heart" – 0:37
 "Naked as a Window" – 1:29
 "Labelship Down" – 0:54

References

External links
Josh Ritter official website
Lyrics

Josh Ritter albums
2007 albums
V2 Records albums